Meshir 10 - Coptic Calendar - Meshir 12

The eleventh day of the Coptic month of Meshir, the sixth month of the Coptic year. In common years, this day corresponds to February 5, of the Julian Calendar, and February 18, of the Gregorian Calendar. This day falls in the Coptic Season of Shemu, the season of the Harvest.

Commemorations

Martyrs 

 The martyrdom of Pope Fabianus, Patriarch of Rome

Saints 

 The departure of Pope John XIII, the 94th Patriarch of the See of Saint Mark

References 

Days of the Coptic calendar